Several plant taxa contain the word macrantha, meaning "large-flowered":
Infrageneric taxa
Cypripedium sect. Macrantha, a group of slipper orchids in the genus Cypripedium
Acer sect. Macrantha, a group of maples in the genus Acer
Papaver sect. Macrantha, a group of poppies in the genus Papaver

See also